Mare Nostrum is a series of swimming meets  with three meets around the Mediterranean in June annually. Until 2005 a meet in Rome was also included in the series. Awards series are:

Prize money
 Overall Series Winner (by FINA points) – 21,000 €
 I position (Men/Women) – 7000 €
 II position – €4000 
 III position – €3000 
 IV position – €2200 
 V position  – €1600 
 VI position – €1400 
 VII position  – €1200 
 VIII position – €800 .
 Mare Nostrum Record – €600 
 Meet Record – €300 
 Event Winner – €330 
 Event Runner Up – €180 
 Event 3rd Place – €90

Meets
Meeting Arena, Canet-en-Roussillon, France
Gran Premi Internacional Ciutat de Barcelona, Barcelona, Spain
International Swimming Meeting of Monte-Carlo, Monaco

Mare Nostrum records

Men

Women

Winners

References

External links
Official site
Mare Nostrum Records

International swimming competitions
Swimming in France
Swimming in Spain
Swimming in Italy
Swimming in Monaco